Gerd Tacke (20 August 1906 in Mittel-Sohra – 23 October 1997) was the CEO of Siemens from 1968 to 1971.

References

1906 births
1997 deaths
People from Zgorzelec County
People from the Province of Silesia
Siemens
Commanders Crosses of the Order of Merit of the Federal Republic of Germany